D128 is a state road on Žirje Island in Croatia connecting the town of Žirje to Žirje ferry port, from where Jadrolinija ferries fly to the mainland, docking in Šibenik and the D33 state road.

The road, as well as all other state roads in Croatia, is managed and maintained by Hrvatske ceste, a state-owned company.

Road junctions and populated areas

Sources

State roads in Croatia
Šibenik
Transport in Šibenik-Knin County